The 1886 Brooklyn Grays season was a season in American baseball. The team finished the season in third place with a record of 76–61, 16 games behind the St. Louis Browns.

Regular season

Season standings

Record vs. opponents

Notable transactions 
 September 1, 1886: Joe Strauss was purchased by the Grays from the Louisville Colonels.

Roster

Player stats

Batting

Starters by position 
Note: Pos = Position; G = Games played; AB = At bats; R = Runs scored; H = Hits; Avg. = Batting average; HR = Home runs; RBI = Runs batted In; SB = Stolen bases

Other batters 
Note: G = Games played; AB = At bats; R = Runs scored; H = Hits; Avg. = Batting average; HR = Home runs; RBI = Runs batted In; SB = Stolen bases

Pitching

Starting pitchers 
Note: G = Games pitched; GS = Games started; IP = Innings pitched; W = Wins; L = Losses; ERA = Earned run average; BB = Walks; SO = Strikeouts; CG = Complete games

Relief pitchers 
Note: G = Games pitched; W = Wins; L = Losses; SV = Saves; ERA = Earned run average; SO = Strikeouts

Notes

References 
Baseball-Reference season page
Baseball Almanac season page

External links 
Acme Dodgers page 
Retrosheet

Los Angeles Dodgers seasons
Brooklyn Grays season
Brooklyn
19th century in Brooklyn
Park Slope